The 2014 Carolina Challenge Cup was the 11th staging of the tournament. The tournament began on February 22 and ended on March 1.

The defending champions, Chicago Fire, will not be participating in the 2014 edition of the tournament. Instead, D.C. United, Houston Dynamo and Seattle Sounders FC will be the three participants in the tournament, in addition to the host, Charleston Battery.

Teams

Standings

Matches

Scorers

1 goal
 Osvaldo Alonso — Seattle Sounders FC
 Davy Arnaud — D.C. United
 Giles Barnes — Houston Dynamo
 Tony Cascio — Houston Dynamo
 Kenny Cooper — Seattle Sounders FC
 Brad Davis — Houston Dynamo
 Fabián Espíndola — D.C. United
 Brad Evans — Seattle Sounders FC
 Colin Falvey — Charleston Battery
 Perry Kitchen — D.C. United
 Obafemi Martins — Seattle Sounders FC
 Marco Pappa — Seattle Sounders FC
 Drew Ruggles — Charleston Battery
 Michael Seaton — D.C. United

Own goals
 David Horst — Houston Dynamo (playing against D.C.)

See also 
 Carolina Challenge Cup
 Charleston Battery
 2014 in American soccer

References 

2014
2014 in American soccer
Carolina Challenge Cup
February 2014 sports events in the United States
March 2014 sports events in the United States